Women's Twenty20 International (WT20I) is the shortest form of women's international cricket. A women's Twenty20 International is a 20 overs-per-side cricket match between two of the International Cricket Council (ICC) members. The first Twenty20 International match was held in August 2004 between England and New Zealand, six months before the first Twenty20 International match was played between two men's teams. The ICC Women's World Twenty20, the highest-level event in the format, was first held in 2009.

In April 2018, the ICC granted full Women's Twenty20 International (WT20I) status to all its members. Therefore, all Twenty20 matches played between two international sides after 1 July 2018 will be a full WT20I. A month after the conclusion of the 2018 Women's Twenty20 Asia Cup, which took place in June 2018, the ICC retrospectively gave all the fixtures in the tournament full WT20I status. On 22 November 2021, in the 2021 ICC Women's T20 World Cup Asia Qualifier tournament, the match between Hong Kong and Nepal was the 1,000th WT20I to be played.

The ICC has announced a new tournament starting in 2027 and called the ICC Women's T20 Champions Cup.

Involved nations
In April 2018, the ICC granted full Women's Twenty20 International (WT20I) status to all its members from 1 July 2018.

The full list of teams who have played full Women's Twenty20 International matches is as follows (correct to 21 December 2022):

Rankings
Before October 2018, ICC did not maintain a separate Twenty20 ranking for the women's game, instead aggregating performance over all three forms of the game into one overall women's teams ranking. In January 2018, ICC granted international status to all matches between associate nations and announced plan to launch separate T20I rankings for women. In October 2018 the T20I rankings were launched with separate ODI rankings for Full Members.

Statistics and records

See also

List of women's Twenty20 International cricket grounds
Women's Test cricket
Women's One Day International
Twenty20 International

References

 
International